The 2022 Karlsruhe Open (also known as the Liqui Moly Open for sponsorship reasons) was a professional tennis tournament played on outdoor clay courts. It was the 3rd edition of the tournament and part of the 2022 WTA 125 tournaments, offering a total of $115,000 in prize money. It took place in Karlsruhe, Germany between 10 and 15 May 2022.

Singles main draw entrants

Seeds 

 1 Rankings as of 25 April 2022.

Other entrants 
The following players received a wildcard into the singles main draw:
  Eva Lys
  Ella Seidel
  Laura Siegemund
  Maria Timofeeva

The following players received entry into the singles main draw through
protected ranking:
  Priscilla Hon
  Bibiane Schoofs

Withdrawals
Before the tournament
  Irina Bara → replaced by  Bibiane Schoofs
  Harriet Dart → replaced by  Katarzyna Kawa
  Vitalia Diatchenko → replaced by  Kathinka von Deichmann

Doubles entrants

Seeds 

 1 Rankings as of 25 April 2022.

Other entrants 
The following pair received a wildcard into the doubles main draw:
  Amina Anshba  /  Maria Timofeeva

Champions

Singles

  Mayar Sherif def.  Bernarda Pera 6–2, 6–4

Doubles

  Mayar Sherif /  Panna Udvardy def.  Yana Sizikova /  Alison Van Uytvanck 5–7, 6–4, [10–2]

References

External links 
 Official website

2022 WTA 125 tournaments
Tennis tournaments in Germany
2022 in German tennis
May 2022 sports events in Germany